DRIZABONE is an international dance music / remixing musical group, led by record producer, musician and songwriter Vincent Garcia. Garcia used various female vocalists to provide the vocal element to his output. Driza Bone (sometimes billed as Drizabone) was primarily popular in the early 1990s. Garcia named his production company after the Driza-Bone brand of waterproof riding coats.

Career
The most successful remix single was of American R&B singer Shanice's 1991 single, "I Love Your Smile". It surpassed the success of the original track, reaching No. 2 on both the U.S. Billboard Hot 100 and the UK Singles Chart. 

Production / remixes by Driza Bone include songs by Lisa Stansfield, Jody Watley, Mary J. Blige, Shanice, Duran Duran, Tom Browne, Barry White, Diana Ross, Kylie Minogue, LuLu, Dasha Logan, Lindy Layton.

Driza Bone's most popular track, as an artist, was the song "Real Love", which reached No. 16 on the UK Singles Chart in June 1991. When this record came out, Drizabone included April, Garcia, and singer Sophie Jones. Jones was soon replaced by Dee Heron, who appeared on the single "Catch the Fire" (UK #54).

Heron was replaced by Kymberley Peer for "Pressure" (UK #33), "Brightest Star" (UK #45), and a re-release of "Real Love" in 1995 (UK No. 24, their biggest hit since the original version of the track). Driza Bone also had a charting album in 1994, titled Conspiracy, which debuted and peaked at No. 72 on the UK Albums Chart in November of that year. All of their chart successes were released on the Fourth & Broadway record label.

Discography

Albums
Conspiracy (1994) UK No.72
All The Way (2010) UK

Singles
"Real Love" (1991) - UK No. 16
"Catch the Fire" (1991) - UK No. 54
"Pressure" (1994) - UK No. 33
"Brightest Star" (1994) - UK No. 45
"Real Love" (re-release) (1995) - UK No. 24

References

Dance music groups
Remixers